Dormelletto is a comune (municipality) in the Province of Novara in the Italian region of Piedmont, located about  northeast of Turin and about  north of Novara.

Dormelletto borders the following municipalities: Angera, Arona, Castelletto sopra Ticino, Comignago, and Sesto Calende.

Demographic evolution

References

External links
 www.comune.dormelletto.no.it/

Cities and towns in Piedmont
Populated places on Lake Maggiore